Kay McDaniel (born September 25, 1957) is an American former professional tennis player.

Biography
Originally from Shreveport, Louisiana, McDaniel was a three-time All-American tennis player at Louisiana State University in the late 1970s.

McDaniel had her best run in a grand slam tournament at the 1979 Wimbledon Championships, with wins over Katja Ebbinghaus and Marie Pinterova, before losing in the third round to 15th seed Betty Stove in three sets.

In 1980 she achieved a rare feat when she won an Avon Futures title in Atlanta as a lucky loser.

McDaniel is now a professor at Lee University, where she teaches health science. She runs a free annual summer camp for kids on the university grounds.

References

External links
 
 

1957 births
Living people
American female tennis players
Tennis people from Louisiana
Sportspeople from Shreveport, Louisiana
LSU Lady Tigers tennis players